Patrick Hughes may refer to:

 Patrick Hughes (artist) (born 1939), British artist
 Patrick Hughes (boxer) (born 1909), Irish Olympic boxer
 Patrick Hughes (cricketer) (born 1943), Irish cricketer
 Patrick Hughes (politician) (1831–1899), Canadian politician
 Patrick Hughes (tennis), British tennis player from the 1920s and 1930s
 Patrick Henry Hughes (born 1988), American musician
 Patrick M. Hughes (born 1942), director of the Defense Intelligence Agency
 Patrick Hughes (filmmaker) (born 1978), Australian film director

See also
 Pat Hughes (disambiguation)